The Pacific Links Bear Mountain Championship was a professional golf tournament on the PGA Tour Champions. It was first played in September 2012 at the Kapolei Golf Course in Kapolei, Hawaii, which is owned and operated by Pacific Links International. It moved to the 27 Club in Tianjin, China for the 2015 season but was eventually canceled. It moved to Victoria, British Columbia, Canada for the 2016 season 

The purse for the 2016 tournament was $2.5 million, with a winner's share of $375,000.

Winners

References

External links
Coverage on the PGA Tour Champions' official site

Former PGA Tour Champions events
Golf in Hawaii
Golf tournaments in British Columbia
Recurring sporting events established in 2012
Recurring sporting events disestablished in 2017
2012 establishments in Hawaii
2017 disestablishments in British Columbia